Arthur Gomes (born 5 October 1969 in Ribeira de Pena) was a Portuguese-born French rugby union player. He played as a fullback.

Gomes played for Paris Université Club until 1996/97, and for Stade Français, from 1997/98 to 2002/03. He won 3 French Championship titles, in 1997/98, 1999/2000 and 2002/03, and the Cup of France in 1998/99. He was runner-up in the Heineken Cup in 2000/01.

He had 6 caps for France, scoring 1 try, 5 points in aggregate, from 1998 to 1999. He played a game in the 1999 Five Nations Championship.

Honours
 Stade Français
French Rugby Union Championship/Top 14: 1997–98, 1999–2000, 2002–03

References

External links
Arthur Gomes International Statistics

1969 births
Living people
French rugby union players
France international rugby union players
Portuguese rugby union players
French people of Portuguese descent
Rugby union fullbacks
Sportspeople from Vila Real District